Song is a Korean family name derived from the Chinese surname Song. Songs make up roughly 1.4% of the Korean population; the 2000 South Korean census found 622,208 in that country.

Kinds
Song (宋) family : Various Korean family name. 
Song (訟) family : unknown origin, later surname change to Sung (成).
Song (松) family : the Song Yang (松讓) ethnicity in the Buyeo kingdom.

Clans

Song (宋) clans include the Yeosan, Eunjin, Jincheon, Yeonan, Yaseong, Cheongju, Sinpyeong, Gimhae, Namyang and Bokheung.

One Song (松) clan is the Yong Song.

List of people with the surname

 (松讓), who surrendered to Dongmyeong of Goguryeo in 37 BCE
Song In (died 1126), Goryeo official 
Song Hui-gyeong (1376–1446), Joseon scholar-official
Song Gan (1405-1480), pen name Seoje, posthumous title Chunggang, promoted to position of Uijeongbu Jwachamchan in 1792
Song Sang-chim, consort of King Sejong of Joseon
Queen Jeongsun (Danjong) (born 1440), consort of King Danjong of Joseon
Song Sang-hyeon (Joseon Dynasty), prefect during the Siege of Dongnae
Song Jun-gil (1606–1672), Joseon Dynasty politician and scholar 
Song Si-yeol (1607–1689), Joseon philosopher
Song Jin-woo (journalist) (1889–1945), Korean journalist, CEO of The Dong-A Ilbo, founder of the Korea Democratic Party
Song Deok-gi (1893–1977), taekkyeon master
Song Gyu (born 1900), second patriarch of Won Buddhism
Song Yo-chan (1918–1980), South Korean chief cabinet minister
Song Hae (born 1927), South Korean TV host and singer
Song Sin-do (born 1932), South Korean human rights activist
Song Soon-Chun (born 1934), South Korean amateur boxer 
Song Jae-ho (born 1937), South Korean actor 
Song Hye-rim (1937-2002), North Korean actress and mistress of Kim Jong-il 
Song Yeong (born 1940), South Korean writer
Song Sang-hyun (born 1941), President of the International Criminal Court
Song Du-yul (born 1944), professor at University of Münster
Song Dae-kwan (born 1946), South Korean trot singer
Song Giwon (born 1947), South Korean novelist
Song Min-soon (born 1948), South Korean diplomat
Song Do Yeong (born 1951), South Korean voice actor
Aree Song (born 1986), Thai golfer
Cathy Song (born 1955), American poet
Naree Song (born 1986), Thai golfer
Song Ji-na (born 1959), South Korean screenwriter 
Song Ok-sook (born 1960), South Korean actress
Song Dong-wook (born 1962), South Korean tennis player 
Song Young-gil (born 1963), mayor of Incheon
Song Hae-sung (born 1964), South Korean director
Song Jin-woo (born 1966), South Korean baseball player 
Song Kang-ho (born 1967), South Korean actor
Song Ju-Seok (born 1967), South Korean soccer player
Song Ji-hyun (born 1969), South Korean handball player, 1988 Olympian
Sanghee Song (born 1970), South Korean artist
Anna Song (born 1971), South Korean-born American politician
Song Il-gon (born 1971), South Korean film director and screenwriter
Song Il-gook (born 1971), South Korean television actor
Luke Song (송욱; born 1972), fashion designer
Song Seung-tae (born 1972), South Korean field hockey player
Song Ji-man (born 1973), South Korean baseball player
Song Yun-ah (born 1973), South Korean model, singer and actress
Song Jae-Kun (born 1974), South Korean short track speed skater
Song Joon-seok (born 1974), South Korean voice actor
Daewon Song (born 1975), South Korean-born American professional skateboarder
Song Jung-Hyun (born 1976), South Korean soccer player
Song Seung-heon (born 1976), South Korean actor
Song Ju-Hee (born 1977), South Korean female soccer player 
Song Chang-eui (born 1979), South Korean actor
Song Dae-nam (born 1979), South Korean judoka, London 2012 Olympic Games gold medalist
Song Chong-gug (born 1979), South Korean soccer player
Song Dong-hwan (born 1980), South Korean ice hockey forward 
Song Seung-jun (born 1980), Beijing 2008 Olympic Games baseball gold medalist pitcher
Song Jong-sun (born 1981), North Korean female soccer player
Song Hye-kyo (born 1981), South Korean actress
Song Suk-woo (born 1983), South Korean short-track speed skater
Song Tae-lim (born 1984), South Korean soccer player 
Song Han-bok (born 1984), South Korean soccer player 
Song Dong-jin (born 1984), South Korean soccer player 
Song Myeong-seob (born 1984), South Korean taekwondo martial artist 
Song Ki-Bok (born 1985), South Korean soccer player
Song Jae-rim (born 1985), South Korean actor
Song Joong-ki (born 1985), South Korean actor
Song Bo-bae (born 1986), South Korean female golfer 
Song Chang-Ho (born 1986), South Korean soccer player 
Song Je-Heon (born 1986), South Korean soccer player 
Song Tae-kon (born 1986), South Korean go player
Song Jin-hyung (born 1987), South Korean soccer player 
Song Ho-young (born 1988), South Korean soccer player 
Song Byung-gu (born 1988), South Korean professional StarCraft player 
Song Ji-eun (born 1990), South Korean idol singer
Song Ji-ho (born 1992), South Korean actor 
Song Min-ho (born 1993), member and rapper of Korean boy group Winner
Song I-han (born 1994), South Korean singer
Song Kang (born 1994), South Korean actor
Song So-hee (born 1997), South Korean singer
Song Yoo-geun (born 1997), South Korea's youngest university student
Song Jung-hee, vice mayor and chief information officer of Seoul
Song Ja, ex-minister of education, ex-president of Yonsei and Myongji University
Song Chang-sik, Korean singer
Song Sae-byeok, Korean actor
Song Ji-hyo (born 1981, Cheon Seong-im), South Korean actress
Song Oh-kyun (1892–1970) Korean Independence Activist
Song Yi-kyun (1885–1927) Korean Independence Activist
Noah Song (born 1997), South Korean-American professional baseball player
Song Ga-in (born 1986, Jo Eun-sim), South Korean trot singer

See also
List of Korean family names
Korean name
Song (Chinese name)

External links
 Ancestry.com. "Song Family History".

References 

Song clans of Korea
Korean-language surnames